William G. Thompson (c. 1866 – March 1940) was an American educator, university administrator, and college football coach. Thompson attended Yale University. He served for fifteen years as the executive director of the Carlisle Indian Industrial School, school disciplinarian, and an instructor of business. He was also the school's first head football coach in 1893 and led the Indians to a 2–1 record. Thompson also coached the Carlisle baseball, basketball, and track teams for five years. From 1897 to 1907, he was in "practical charge of the athletics" at the school. In 1907, he left Carlisle to teach at Reading High School for three years. Thompson died in March 1940.

Head coaching record

References

1860s births
1940 deaths
American educators
Carlisle Indians athletic directors
Carlisle Indians baseball coaches
Carlisle Indians football coaches
College men's basketball head coaches in the United States
Yale University alumni